Customary land is land which is owned by indigenous communities and administered in accordance with their customs, as opposed to statutory tenure usually introduced during the colonial periods. Common ownership is one form of customary land ownership.

Since the late 20th century, statutory recognition and protection of indigenous and community land rights continues to be a major challenge. The gap between formally recognized and customarily held and managed land is a significant source of underdevelopment, conflict, and environmental degradation.

In the Malawi Land Act of 1965, "Customary Land" is defined as "all land which is held, occupied or used under customary law, but does not include any public land". 

In most countries of the Pacific islands, customary land remains the dominant land tenure form. Distinct customary systems of tenure have evolved on different islands and areas within the Pacific region. In any country there may be many different types of customary tenure. The amount of customary land ownership out of the total land area of Pacific island nations is the following: 97% in Papua New Guinea, 98% in Vanuatu, 88% in Fiji, 87% in the Solomon Islands, and 81% in Samoa.

See also 
 Aboriginal title
 Indigenous land rights
 Indigenous peoples

References

Property law
Real property law
Indigenous politics
Common law
Land tenure